Mary Constance Elphinstone Wemyss (née Lutyens; 14 January 1868 – 15 March 1951) was an English novelist who published her work under the name of Mrs George Wemyss.

Early life
Wemyss was born in Kensington, Middlesex, one of the thirteen children of Captain Charles Henry Augustus Lutyens (1829–1915), a soldier and painter, and Mary Theresa Gallwey (c. 1832–1906) from Killarney, Ireland. She was baptised as Mary Constance Elphinstone on 20 February 1868 at St Paul's, Onslow Square, Kensington. The Lutyens family was then living at 16, Onslow Square.

The older sister of Edwin Lutyens, she grew up in Thursley, Surrey.

Life and career
On 6 March 1890, at Holy Trinity Brompton, Knightsbridge, aged 22 and still living at 16, Onslow Square, Mary Lutyens married George Wemyss, a captain in the West Yorkshire Regiment, who gave his father's name as Frederick Augustus von Wachsmann. The Rev. H. W. Webb-Peploe, Vicar of St Paul's, Onslow Square, officiated. George Wemyss had been born in New Zealand.

Wemyss published at least twelve novels between 1910 and 1919. Already by 1914 her work was the subject of interest in the United States.

Reviewing her Oranges and Lemons in 1919, Punch noted 

The New York Times also reviewed Oranges and Lemons, summing it up as “A CONVENTIONAL and mildly — very mildly — amusing little story”.

In 1939, at the outbreak of the Second World War, George and Mary Wemyss were living together near Stroud, Gloucestershire. He was a retired Major, while she was noted as having private means. In their household were a butler, a cook, a lady's maid, and two housemaids. George Wemyss died at home at Atcombe Court, Woodchester, Gloucestershire, in March 1944, leaving an estate valued at £22,920. His widow survived him until 15 March 1951, dying at 16, Albert Hall Mansions, Kensington. Probate on her estate valued it at £54,699.

Bibliography
The Professional Aunt, by Mrs George Wemyss (London: Constable, 1910)
Things We Thought Of: told from a child's point of view (London: Constable & Co., 1911)
All about all of us (London: Constable & Co., 1911)
Prudent Priscilla, by Mrs George Wemyss (1912; reprinted by Palala Press, 2016)
A Lost Interest, by Mrs George Wemyss (London: Constable & Co., 1912, illustrated by Balliol Salmon; Toronto: McClelland and Goodchild, 1912)
Grannie for Granted (London: Constable, 1914)
Jaunty in Charge, by Mrs George Wemyss (New York: E. P. Dutton & Company, 1915; reprinted by Forgotten Books (2018), 
Petunia, by Mrs George Wemyss (1916; reprinted by Wentworth Press, 2019)
Impossible People, by Mrs George Wemyss (London: Constable & Co., 1918)
People of Popham, by Mrs George Wemyss (1919)
Oranges and Lemons (1919)
Tubby and the others (London: Blackie, 1935, for children )

Notes

External links
The Professional Aunt by Mary C. E. Wemyss, Project Gutenberg Release #5736
Things We Thought Of: told from a child's point of view, HathiTrust

1868 births
1951 deaths
English women novelists
20th-century English women writers
Lutyens family